Elephant Butte is a  summit in Grand County, Utah. It is located within Arches National Park, and is the highest point in the park. Like many of the rock formations in the park, Elephant Butte is composed of Entrada Sandstone. Elephant Butte is a flat-topped cap surrounded by numerous towers and fins including Parade of Elephants. Double Arch is also a natural feature of Elephant Butte and was used as a backdrop for the opening scene of Indiana Jones and the Last Crusade. Precipitation runoff from Elephant Butte drains east into the nearby Colorado River. The first ascent was made September 8, 1953, by Alex Cresswell and Fred Ayres.

Geology
Elephant Butte lies above an underground salt bed, causing the formation of the arches, spires, balanced rocks, sandstone fins, and eroded monoliths in the area. The rock is Entrada Sandstone.

Climate
Spring and fall are the most favorable seasons to experience Arches National Park, when highs average  and lows average . Summer temperatures often exceed . Winters are cold, with highs averaging  , and lows averaging  . As part of a high desert region, it can experience wide daily temperature fluctuations. The park receives an average of less than 10 inches (25 cm) of rain annually.

Gallery

See also

 List of mountains in Utah
 Geology of Utah

References

External links

 Arches National Park National Park Service
 Elephant Butte Weather forecast

Landforms of Grand County, Utah
Buttes of Utah
Colorado Plateau
Arches National Park
Highest points of United States national parks
North American 1000 m summits